The Recopa de Europa de Futsal was a  futsal club competition contested annually by the most recent winners of all European domestic cup competitions. It was founded in 2002/03, is organised by LNFS. It's unofficial by the UEFA.

Results

Performance by nation

External links 
Prima edizione su Futsalplanet.com
Seconda edizione su Futsalplanet.com
Terza edizione su Futsalplanet.com
Quarta edizione su Futsalplanet.com
la quinta edizione sul sito della LNFS
Recopa Cup 2012

International club futsal competitions
Defunct international club association football competitions in Europe
Futsal competitions in Europe